Sir Michael Richardson Angus  (5 May 1930 – 13 March 2010) was a British businessman, best known as chair of Unilever.

Biography
Angus was born in West Ashford, Kent and raised in the Cotswolds near to Cirencester, and educated at Marling School, Stroud, Gloucestershire. Angus graduated in mathematics from Bristol University.

Career
Joining Anglo-Dutch conglomerate Unilever straight from university, he spent most of his career in the company's toiletries businesses (soaps and toothpaste) in France and Britain. In 1979 he moved to Lever Brothers in New York City, where he spent four years cleaning house at the Lever Brothers subsidiary. He returned to UK as the joint-chairman alongside Floris Maljers.

Other positions
Angus was President of the Confederation of British Industry from 7 May 1992 to May 1994. Sir Michael's other appointments include: – 
Chairman of Whitbread Plc
non-executive directors and Deputy chairman British Airways Plc
non-executive director and chairman Boots Group
non-executive director National Westminster Bank
Chairman of Ashridge Business School
Member of the Council of British Executive Service Overseas
Chairman of the Trustees of The Leverhulme Trust
Director of the Ditchley Foundation
International Counsellor Emeritus of the Conference Board in New York
non-executive director for the Halcrow Group Limited.
Chairman of the Royal Agricultural College, Cirencester until 2005.

Angus was appointed a Deputy Lieutenant of Gloucestershire in 1997.

Personal life
Married to Isabel, the couple had three children: Barbara, Simon and Nicholas. They lived on their organic farm in North Cerney, from which they marketed cheese made from their herd of goats. Angus was an acknowledged wine buff. He died aged 79 in his home on 13 March 2010.  Lady Angus died in 2016.

References

External links
 Sir Michael Angus – Daily Telegraph obituary
 Sir Michael Angus – Times obituary
 Sir Michael Angus – Guardian obituary
 Sir Michael Angus – Scotsman obituary

1930 births
2010 deaths
Alumni of the University of Bristol
20th-century English farmers
Deputy Lieutenants of Gloucestershire
Knights Bachelor
People associated with the Royal Agricultural University
People from Cirencester
Unilever people
People educated at Marling School
Deaths from lung cancer in England
20th-century English businesspeople
21st-century English farmers